Reazul Mawla Rezu is a film director, producer and screenplay writer in the Indian subcontinent. In 2015, he won the Bangladesh National Film Award for Best Director for the film Bapjaner Bioscope.

Career 
Rezu directed Bapjaner Bioscope. The film earned eight National Awards. Rezu is the youngest national award winning film director in South Asia.

In 2021, Rezu signed a contract to appear in the film Madhyavitta.

Filmography 
 Bapjaner Bioscope – (2015)

Awards and nominations
National Film Awards

References

External links
 
 Reazul Mawla Rezu at Instagram

Living people
Best Director National Film Award (Bangladesh) winners
Year of birth missing (living people)
Best Screenplay National Film Award (Bangladesh) winners